The Sbeitla's Spring International Festival (Arabic: مهرجان ربيع سبيطلة الدولي), is an annual festival held in Sbeitla, Tunisia, since 2000. His events take place at the Sbeitla ancient Roman theatre and it features colourful performances folklore troupes and poetry from Tunisia, Arab and European countries.

References

See also
List of festivals in Tunisia

Festivals in Tunisia
Spring (season) events in Tunisia